The San Jose State Spartans are the intercollegiate athletic teams that represent San José State University. SJSU sports teams compete in the Mountain West Conference (MW) at the NCAA Division I level, with football competing in the Football Bowl Subdivision (FBS). San Jose State is one of 20 Division I members in the state of California, seven of which are FBS members. The other FBS members are fellow MW conference mates Fresno State and San Diego State, plus Pac-12 Conference members University of California, Stanford, UCLA and USC. SJSU has participated in athletics since it first fielded a baseball team in 1890.

San José State sports teams have won NCAA national titles in track and field, cross country, golf, boxing, fencing and tennis. As of 2022, SJSU has won 10 NCAA national Division 1 team championships and produced 50 NCAA national Division 1 individual champions. SJSU also has achieved an international reputation for its judo program, winning 50 National Collegiate Judo Association (NCJA) men's team championship titles and 23 NCJA women's team championship titles between 1962 and 2022.

SJSU alumni have won 20 Olympic medals (including seven gold medals) dating back to the first gold medal won by Willie Steele in track and field in the 1948 Olympics. Alumni also have won medals in swimming, judo, water polo and boxing.

The track team coached by "Bud" Winter earned San Jose State the nickname "Speed City," and produced Olympic medalists and social activists Lee Evans, Tommie Smith and John Carlos. Smith and Carlos are perhaps best remembered for giving the raised fist salute from the medalists' podium during the 1968 Summer Olympics in Mexico City.

San José State University sponsors teams in eight men's and twelve women's NCAA sanctioned sports. Jeff Konya has served as the director of athletics since June 12, 2021.

Nickname and mascot history
SJSU's mascot changed many times before the school finally adopted the Spartans as the official mascot and nickname in 1922.  Mascots and nicknames prior to 1922 included the Daniels, the Teachers, the Pedagogues, the Normals and the Normalites. The school's current mascot is Sammy the Spartan, or Sammy Spartan for short.

After 1887, the official name of the San Jose campus was the State Normal School at San Jose. The school's athletics teams initially played under the "Normal" identity, but they gradually shifted to the "State Normal School" identity, as evidenced by images of SNS football and basketball squads from this era. In official publications, the school was referred to as the "California State Normal School, San Jose."

Sports sponsored

All varsity teams representing San José State University compete in the Mountain West Conference except beach volleyball (Southland Conference), gymnastics and women's water polo (Mountain Pacific Sports Federation), men's soccer (Western Athletic Conference), and men's water polo (Golden Coast Conference).

Baseball

The Spartan baseball team made NCAA tournament appearances in 1955, 1971, 2000 and 2002. In 2000, the team advanced to the College World Series.
From 1997–2013, the SJSU baseball team competed in the Western Athletic Conference, earning three WAC pennants in 1997, 2000 and 2009.
Under head coach and SJSU alumnus Sam Piraro (1987–2012), the SJSU baseball team reached the 30-win mark 17 times (including five 40+ wins seasons) and appeared in the national rankings 47 times.
The SJSU baseball team has fielded sixteen All-Americans including four first-team selections.
Over 95 Spartans have been taken in the Major League Baseball draft since 1965. As of 2018, two former Spartans are active professional baseball players in both major and minor leagues.

Basketball

The SJSU men's basketball team has garnered 10 conference championship titles beginning with a California Coast Conference championship victory in 1925. The Spartans' most recent conference championship victory occurred in 1996 when SJSU defeated Utah State in overtime to win the Big West championship tournament.
The SJSU men's basketball team has made three NCAA tournament appearances (1951, 1980 and 1996). SJSU was defeated in the first round all three times.
The SJSU men's basketball team has made one National Invitation Tournament (NIT) appearance (1981), but was defeated in the first round.
The SJSU men's basketball team has made two College Basketball Invitational (CBI) tournament appearances (2011 and 2023).
Twelve former SJSU men's basketball players have been drafted into the NBA.
San Jose State began fielding a varsity women's basketball team in 1974.

Cross country

In 1962, the San José State University cross country team became the first racially integrated team to win the NCAA national championship.

The San Jose State men's cross country team has appeared in the NCAA tournament six times, finishing first in 1962 and 1963. The team has compiled an unofficial record of 84–19.

The San Jose State women's cross country team never made the NCAA tournament.

Football

San Jose State first fielded a football team in 1893 and has won 17 conference championships dating back to 1932. During the 1930s and 1940s, the Spartan football program was considered a powerhouse, winning eight conference championships over an 18-year span. The 1932 team finished 7–0–2 and the 1939 team finished 13–0, marking the only undefeated seasons in school history.

More recent success includes an 11–2 finish in 2012 when SJSU achieved its first-ever BCS ranking and first national ranking since 1990. SJSU was ranked No. 21 in both the 2012 post-season Associated Press Poll and the USA Today Coaches' Poll.

The football team had another successful season in 2020 when it cracked the AP Poll top-25 for the first time since 2012 and appeared in the College Football Playoff ranking at No. 24. The team also won its first conference championship title since 1991. The Spartans finished the 2020 season 7–1 and ranked No. 24 in the AP Poll.

Additional football facts

The San Jose State Spartans football team served unexpectedly with the Honolulu Police Department during World War II. The team had just arrived in Honolulu to play the University of Hawaiʻi at Mānoa in the Shrine Bowl, but was stranded on the islands after the Pearl Harbor attack.
SJSU earned more Big West Conference football championship titles than any other team in the history of the Big West conference.
The SJSU football team has made 12 bowl appearances. Its most recent bowl appearance occurred in 2022 when the Spartans faced Eastern Michigan in the Potato Bowl in Boise, Idaho.
SJSU, the University of Dayton, Eastern Illinois University and the University of Arkansas are the only schools known to have produced two alumni who would go on to serve as head coaches of Super Bowl-winning teams.
SJSU has produced over 70 All-America team members, including five first-team selections.
 As of December 2022, 139 San Jose State players have gone on to play in the NFL, and five former Spartans are actively playing in the NFL. The 139 players include 121 draftees, six NFL Pro Bowl selections, six first-round draft picks, two MVP award winners, and one NFL Rookie of the Year.

San Jose State has appeared in 12 bowl games and has an overall bowl record of 7-5.

Golf

Men
The SJSU men's golf team has garnered one NCAA championship title (1948) and two NCAA individual champions, Bob Harris in 1948 and Terry Small in 1964.
The SJSU men's golf team has won 10 conference championships:
West Coast Conference (1): 1968
Big West Conference (8): 1970, 1974, 1975, 1977, 1981, 1982, 1984, 1985
Western Athletic Conference (1): 2012
The SJSU men's golf team has garnered 12 Western Intercollegiate tournament team championships and 12 individual Western Intercollegiate championships, thus earning its place as the winningest team in tournament history.
The SJSU men's golf team has produced 33 All-America team members (including four 1st-team members) and seven different PGA Tour winners.
Notable alumni (men's): Arron Oberholser, Ken Venturi

Men's NCAA Championship Results

Women
The SJSU women's golf team has garnered three NCAA championship titles (1987, 1989, 1992), one AIAW individual champion (Patty Sheehan in 1980), one NCAA individual champion (Pat Hurst in 1989), 18 conference championships, and 37 All-America honors. The team's most recent conference championship came in 2022, when the Spartans won the Mountain West Conference tournament.
 The SJSU women's golf team won the 2022 NCAA Ann Arbor Regional title and finished 7th overall in the 2022 NCAA national tournament. SJSU golfer Natasha Andrea Oon finished 2nd overall on the D-I national tournament leaderboard. The 2022 women's golf team also finished No. 3 in the final NCAA national rankings.
Notable alumnae (women's): Danielle Ammaccapane, Dana Dormann, Pat Hurst, Juli Inkster

Women's NCAA Championship Results

In June 2017, the first phase of the Spartan Golf Complex was completed, which includes a 400-yard driving range, hitting positions for 80 golfers, as well as chipping and putting areas. Phase 2 of the facility is currently in the planning stages and is expected to include a clubhouse, locker rooms, meeting rooms and coaches' offices.

Indoor track and field

The San Jose State men's indoor track and field team appeared in the NCAA Division I national tournament six times, finishing as high as 3rd in 1969. The San Jose State women's indoor track and field team never made the NCAA Division I tournament.

Soccer

The Spartans men's soccer team went an undefeated 18–0–1 during the 2000 regular season, finishing with a 20–1–1 overall record. The team concluded the regular season as the No. 1-ranked team in the country.
The Spartans men's soccer team has made a total of 14 NCAA championship appearances.
The Spartans men's soccer team won the Mountain Pacific Sports Federation (MPSF) championship title in 2000 and 2003.
Two Spartans have been taken in the Major League Soccer (MLS) SuperDraft since 1998.
The Spartans women's soccer team won the Western Athletic Conference championship title in 2000, 2009 and 2010, and won the Mountain West Conference championship title in 2015, 2018 and 2022.

The San Jose State men's soccer team has an NCAA Division I tournament record of 7–14 through fourteen appearances.

The San Jose State women's soccer team has an NCAA Division I tournament record of 0–4 through four appearances.

Softball

The SJSU Spartan softball team earned NCAA appearances in 1990, 1992, 2013, and 2017.
Phases one and two of the new SJSU Spartan softball complex were completed in 2018. As of 2021, the final phase is under construction and will add permanent bleachers, restrooms, a concession stand and press box. The final stadium will be an enclosed facility with seating for over 700.

The San Jose State Spartans women's softball team has an NCAA Division I Tournament record of 1–8 through four appearances.

Tennis
The San Jose State women's tennis team appeared in the NCAA tournament in 2013 and 2017. 
A new San José State University tennis complex was completed in July 2018.
The Mubadala Silicon Valley Classic professional tennis tournament was moved to the new SJSU tennis venue in 2018.

Volleyball

The San Jose State women's volleyball team has made 12 NCAA tournament appearances since it first became recognized as a varsity sport at SJSU.
Spartan volleyball made it to the "final four" in the NCAA tournament in 1984.  
The Spartan volleyball team joined the Western Athletic Conference in 1996 and is a part of the Mountain West Conference as of 2013.
Seven coaches have led the volleyball team, with Craig Choate compiling the best win-loss record.
Following Choate, coach Oscar Crespo led the Spartans for six years before retiring. 
Trent Kersten replaced Crespo in February 2020. Kersten has strong ties to USA Volleyball and most recently led his team to a gold medal at the High Performance Championships in 2019.  Kersten played at UCLA under John Speraw. 
The Spartan volleyball team participated in its inaugural sand season in 2014. Following recognition by the NCAA as a championship sport, the team will continue as both an indoor and outdoor program.

The San Jose State women's volleyball team has an NCAA Division I tournament record of 8–12 through twelve appearances.

Water polo

The San Jose State men's water polo team has an NCAA Division I tournament record of 5-4 through four appearances and played twice in the national championship match.

Club sports
In addition to its various NCAA Division I sports programs, San José State University has a very active club sports community consisting of approximately 25 sports and 50 teams. Many of the club sports teams are run and organized by students, although some of the more established teams employ full-time paid coaches and enjoy strong alumni support. The list of club sports active at SJSU includes:

Men's and women's archery, men's and women's badminton, baseball, men's and women's basketball, men's and women's bowling, men's and women's boxing, men's and women's cycling, dancesport, men's and women's dragon boat racing, esports, men's and women's fencing, men's and women's figure skating, men's and women's gymnastics, ACHA Division II and Division lll men's ice hockey, women's ice hockey, men's and women's judo, MCLA Division II men's lacrosse, women's lacrosse, mountain biking, men's and women's powerlifting, men's and women's quidditch, men's roller hockey, men's and women's rugby, salsa, men's and women's soccer, softball, men's and women's swimming, track and field, triathlon, ultimate Frisbee, men's and women's volleyball, men's and women's water polo, and men's and women's wrestling.

Hockey
Founded in 1990, the San Jose State men's ice hockey team garnered one PCHA Division ll championship (1992) and four PCHA Division l championship titles (1993, 1994, 1995, and 1997), before withdrawing from the PCHA and becoming an independent American Collegiate Hockey Association (ACHA) Division ll team in 1998. SJSU won one additional PCHA Division 1 title as a non-member in 2017.

In 1992, the team went undefeated, finishing the season with a 17-0 record.
The team finished 26-1-1 (18-0-1 at home) in 2006, and went undefeated through 42 consecutive home games from 2004–2007.
The SJSU hockey team has qualified for the ACHA national championship tournament nine times, finishing as high as 10th in 2010.
San Jose State hosted the 2011 ACHA national tournament.
San Jose State's men's ice hockey team posted 26 consecutive winning seasons from 1991–2017.

Judo
The San Jose State judo program was established in 1937 to help train police cadets. In 1940, sophomore biology major Yosh Uchida was hired as the student coach. The program was disbanded during World War II, and reestablished in 1946 upon Uchida's return to the college.

In the late 1940s and early 1950s, Uchida and University of California, Berkeley coach Henry Stone established rules to allow their students to compete with each other, including a weight class system. Uchida and Stone convinced the Amateur Athletic Union to sanction judo as a sport, and San Jose State hosted the first AAU national championship in 1953.

In 1962, the Spartans won the first National Collegiate Judo Championship. They would continue to dominate the event to the present day, winning 50 National Collegiate Judo Association (NCJA) men's team championship titles and 23 NCJA women's team championship titles between 1962 and 2022.

In 2005, alumnus and coach Mike Swain announced the establishment of the Swain Scholarship, the first full athletic scholarship in judo at an American university. In 2008, the SJSU judo program was named one of six National Training Sites by USA Judo.

Notable SJSU Judoka (Olympic medalists, etc)

Yosh Uchida, head coach 1964 United States Olympic Judo Team
Ben Nighthorse Campbell, gold medalist, 1963 Pan American Games
Gerardo Padilla, gold medalist, 1979 and 1983 Pan American Games
Bobby Berland, silver medalist, 1984 Olympic Games
Kevin Asano, silver medalist, 1988 Olympic Games
Mike Swain, bronze medalist, 1988 Olympic Games; gold medalist, 1987 World Championships (first American male to win World Championships); head coach, 1996 U.S. Olympic judo team
Joe Wanang, gold medalist, 1991 Pan American Games
Marti Malloy, bronze medalist, 2012 Olympic Games; silver medalist, 2013 World Championships

Rugby

San Jose State Spartan Rugby was established in 1971 and competes in the Pacific Western Rugby Conference. The Pacific Western Rugby Conference plays at the Division 1AA level. The Spartans compete against  Chico State, Fresno State, San Francisco State University, Stanford University, University of California Santa Cruz and University of Nevada. San Jose State competes for the USA Rugby National Championship in both 15's and in 7's. In 2013, SJSU finished first in the conference in 7's competition.  According to the published SJSU rugby team mission statement, "San Jose State Rugby teaches Spartans courage, commitment, and character through the game of rugby for success both on and off the field."

Salsa

San Jose State's salsa team, "Spartan Mambo," was established in 2010 and competes at amateur and collegiate competitions across the country. Spartan Mambo holds two championship titles from the College Salsa Congress in 2011 and 2015 as well as the 2015 and 2016 Collegiate Salsa Open. Spartan Mambo also won the Collegiate Teams division at the 2013 World Latin Dance Cup.

Table tennis
The SJSU table tennis team regularly competes in National Collegiate Table Tennis Association tournaments. The San Jose State table tennis team rose to No. 4 in the national rankings and competed in the NCTTA national championship tournament in 2012. The team was led by Truong Tu and reached the semifinals.

Discontinued

Wrestling
Wrestling has a history at San José State University dating back to the early 1930s, although SJSU has not sponsored a Division 1 wrestling program since the 1988 season. Eddie Baza is one of three two-time All-America wrestlers in San Jose State University history and was inducted into the Spartan Sports Hall of Fame in 2005.

Championships

Appearances

San José State University sports teams have competed in NCAA national tournaments across 16 active sports (9 men's and 7 women's) 171 times at the Division I FBS level.

 Baseball (4): 1955, 1971, 2000, 2002
 Men's basketball (3): 1951, 1980, 1996
 Men's cross country (6): 1961, 1962, 1963, 1965, 1966, 1967
 Football (11): 1946, 1949, 1971, 1981, 1986, 1987, 1990, 2006, 2012, 2015, 2020
 Men's golf (32): 1947, 1948, 1949, 1950, 1955, 1956, 1957, 1959, 1963, 1964, 1965, 1966, 1967, 1968, 1972, 1973, 1974, 1976, 1977, 1978, 1979, 1980, 1981, 1982, 1983, 1984, 1985, 1987, 1992, 1994, 1996, 1997
 Women's golf (22): 1982, 1984, 1985, 1986, 1987, 1988, 1989, 1990, 1991, 1992, 1993, 1994, 1995, 1996, 1997, 1999, 2000, 2001, 2010, 2013, 2019, 2022
 Women's gymnastics (8): 2003, 2006, 2008, 2009, 2011, 2012, 2014, 2022
 Men's soccer (14): 1963, 1964, 1966, 1967, 1968, 1969, 1970, 1971, 1972, 1974, 1976, 1998, 2000, 2003
 Women's soccer (4): 2000, 2015, 2018, 2022
 Softball (4): 1990, 1992, 2013, 2017
 Women's swimming and diving (3): 1984, 1985, 1986
 Women's tennis (2): 2013, 2017, 2021
 Men's indoor track and field (6): 1969, 1977, 1983, 1984, 1985, 1987
 Men's outdoor track and field (39): 1934, 1937, 1938, 1946, 1947, 1948, 1949, 1950, 1951, 1952, 1953, 1956, 1957, 1958, 1959, 1960, 1961, 1962, 1963, 1964, 1965, 1966, 1967, 1968, 1969, 1971, 1973, 1975, 1976, 1977, 1978, 1979, 1980, 1981, 1982, 1983, 1984, 1985, 1986
 Women's volleyball (12): 1982, 1983, 1984, 1985, 1986, 1987, 1988, 1989, 1990, 1998, 2000, 2001
 Men's water polo (4): 1970, 1971, 1972, 1973

Team

The San Jose State Spartans have earned 10 NCAA championships at the Division I level.

 Men's (7)
 Boxing (3): 1958, 1959, 1960
 Cross country (2): 1962, 1963
 Golf (1): 1948
 Outdoor track and field (1): 1969
 Women's (3)
 Golf (3): 1987, 1989, 1992

Results

Below are five SJSU national championship titles not granted by the NCAA:

 Women's fencing (5): 1975, 1976, 1977, 1978, 1979 (AIAW)

Below are 79 SJSU national club team championship titles:

 Women's bowling (1): 1976 (USBC)
 Women's fencing (5): 1975, 1976, 1977, 1978, 1979 (NIWFA)
 Co-ed flying (3): 1966, 1968, 1969 (NIFA)
 Men's judo (50): 1962, 1963, 1964, 1965, 1966, 1967, 1968, 1969, 1970, 1971, 1971, 1973, 1974, 1975, 1976, 1977, 1978, 1979, 1980, 1981, 1982, 1983, 1986, 1987, 1989, 1990, 1991, 1992, 1993, 1994, 1995, 1996, 1997, 1998, 1999, 2000, 2001, 2002, 2003, 2005, 2006, 2007, 2008, 2009, 2012, 2013, 2014, 2015, 2016, 2017 (NCJA) 
 Women's judo (22): 1978, 1989, 1990, 1991, 1992, 1993, 1996, 1998, 1999, 2001, 2002, 2003, 2005, 2006, 2007, 2008, 2010, 2013, 2016, 2017, 2018, 2019, 2022 (NCJA)

Individual

San Jose State has produced 50 NCAA Division I individual championship winners.

At the NCAA Division II level, San Jose State has garnered two individual championship titles. Additionally, Patty Sheehan is an individual champion in women's golf at the highest level for the AIAW.

Rivals

Fresno State

San Jose State's biggest rival is California State University, Fresno, due in large part to the two schools' geographic proximity and long history of competing in the same conferences. Fresno State is San Jose State's most played opponent in the Mountain West Conference for college football and college basketball. Fresno State and San Jose State first started playing each other as members of the California Coast Conference in the 1920s.

Stanford

San Jose State also has a natural athletics rivalry with the Stanford Cardinal of Stanford University, due in large part to the two school's geographic proximity. The approximate physical distance between the two universities is 23 miles. Additionally, San Jose State and Stanford are each known for having a large alumni workforce presence in Silicon Valley. The two schools first played each other in football in 1900.

Facilities

The Event Center, Spartan Recreation and Aquatic Center, and the Spartan Complex are the principal sports facilities on the main campus for athletes. Additional athletics facilities, including CEFCU Stadium (formerly known as Spartan Stadium), athletics department administrative offices and multiple training and practice facilities, are located on SJSU's 62-acre (25.1 ha) south campus approximately 1.5 mi (2.4 km) south of the main campus.

A CEFCU Stadium east-side building addition is currently under construction at a projected cost of $57.6 million. Known as the Spartan Athletics Center, the 55,000 square-foot, multi-story facility will house a new football operations center, locker rooms, offices, meeting and training rooms and a sports medicine center. The facility will also include soccer team offices and locker rooms, as well as dining and hospitality facilities, event spaces and premium viewing areas. Along with construction of the SAC, a major renovation of the stadium's entire east side is currently underway.

The east-side stadium renovation has temporarily reduced seating capacity at CEFCU Stadium from just over 30,000 to 21,520. Approximately 9,000 seats were removed from the stadium in 2019 to make way for the new building. This includes virtually all of the east-side stadium seating and some of the north end zone bleachers. The north end zone bleachers were removed to make way for construction of a new state-of-the-art video scoreboard and outdoor bar and lounge area. The new scoreboard was completed in 2020. SAC construction and the east and north-side stadium renovations are projected to be completed in August 2023.

In April 2014, a new $75 million master plan to renovate the entire South Campus was unveiled. The estimated cost has since been increased to $150 million including the cost of the new football stadium addition. The plan calls for construction of a golf training facility, new baseball and softball stadiums, new outdoor recreation and intramural facility, new soccer and tennis facilities, three beach volleyball courts and a new multilevel parking garage. The new golf, soccer and tennis facilities opened in 2017. The new softball facility opened in 2018, and the beach volleyball courts were completed in 2019. The intramural facility and parking garage were completed in 2021. Remaining projects are either under construction or still in the planning stages.

In August 2015, a $55 million renovation of the Spartan Complex was completed. The Spartan Complex houses open recreation spaces, gymnasia, an indoor aquatics center, the kinesiology department, weight rooms, locker rooms, dance and judo studios, and other classroom space. The primary project objectives were to upgrade the structures to make them compliant with building codes, correct ADA deficiencies, correct fire safety deficiencies, expand and modify existing structures, and hazmat abatement.

A new student recreation and aquatic center was completed in 2019. At a cost of $139 million, the new facility houses a gymnasium, weight and fitness center, exercise rooms, rock climbing wall, sports club organizations, and competition and recreation pools with support spaces. The new facility is located on the main campus at the corner of 7th Street and San Carlos close to the existing aquatic and student recreation centers. The estimated project completion date is set for December 2018.

In June 2017, the first phase of the Spartan Golf Complex was completed, which includes a 400-yard driving range, hitting positions for 80 golfers, and chipping and putting areas. Phase 2 of the facility is currently in the planning stages and is expected to include a clubhouse, locker rooms, meeting rooms and coaches' offices.

Phases one and two of the new SJSU Spartan softball complex were completed in 2018. As of 2021 the final phase is under construction and will add permanent bleachers, restrooms, a concession stand and press box. The final stadium will be an enclosed facility with seating for over 700.

Phase I of the San José State University tennis complex was completed in 2018 and includes six uncovered, USTA-sanctioned courts and a 4,000 seat spectator court. Phase II is slated to include six USTA covered courts and a clubhouse.

Main Campus
Provident Credit Union Event Center — men's and women's basketball
Spartan Complex — women's gymnastics, women's volleyball
Spartan Recreation and Aquatic Center (SRAC) — women's swimming and diving, men's and women's water polo

South Campus
CEFCU Stadium — football
San Jose Municipal Stadium — baseball
SJSU Tennis Complex — women's tennis
Solar4America Ice — men's club hockey 
Spartan Soccer Complex — men's and women's soccer
Spartan Softball Stadium — softball
Spartan Golf Complex — men's and women's golf (practice facility)
Spartan Beach  — Beach Volleyball

Off Campus
Pasatiempo Golf Club, San Jose Country Club, Cinnabar Hills Golf Club, and Almaden Country Club — men's golf
West Valley College Beach Volleyball Complex — women's beach volleyball

Former facilities
Bud Winter Field once known as "Speed City" (track and field) — demolished in 2019

Notable sports alumni

Baseball
Jeff Ball – former Major League Baseball player, San Francisco Giants
Aaron Bates – Major League Baseball player, Boston Red Sox
Mike Brown – former Major League Baseball player, California Angels and Pittsburgh Pirates
Ken Caminiti – former Major League Baseball player, Houston Astros et al.
Anthony Chavez – former Major League Baseball player, California Angels
Chris Codiroli – former Major League Baseball player, Oakland Athletics
Kevin Frandsen  — Major League Baseball player, San Francisco Giants
Gary Hughes – former Major League Baseball assistant coach, Chicago Cubs
Pat Hughes – play-by-play radio broadcaster for Chicago Cubs
Jason Jimenez – former Major League Baseball player, Detroit Tigers and Tampa Bay Devil Rays
Randy Johnson – former Major League Baseball player, Atlanta Braves
Brad Kilby – Major League Baseball player, Oakland Athletics
Hal Kolstad – former Major League Baseball player, Boston Red Sox
Mark Langston – former Major League Baseball player, Seattle Mariners, California Angels, et al.
Larry Lintz – former Major League Baseball player, Montreal Expos et al.
John Oldham – former Major League Baseball player, Cincinnati Reds
Sam Piraro – winningest head baseball coach in SJSU history
Jason Simontacchi – former Major League Baseball player, St. Louis Cardinals and Washington Nationals
Anthony Telford – former Major League Baseball player, Baltimore Orioles, Montreal Expos, et al.
Carlos Torres – Major League Baseball player, Chicago White Sox

Basketball
Tariq Abdul-Wahad (Olivier Saint-Jean) – former NBA player (Sacramento Kings)
Ricky Berry – former NBA player (Sacramento Kings)
Bobby Crowe – former NBA player (Baltimore Bullets)
Coby Dietrick – former NBA player (San Antonio Spurs and Golden State Warriors)
Justin Graham – professional overseas basketball player 
Dick Groves – former NBA player (San Diego Rockets)
Darnell "Dr. Dunk" Hillman – former NBA player (Indiana Pacers, New Jersey Nets et al.)
Ed Hughes – former BAA player (Washington Capitols)
Stu Inman – former NBA player and coach (Chicago Stags, Portland Trail Blazers, et al.)
Chris McNeally – former NBA player (Kansas City-Omaha Kings)
Doug Murrey – former NBA player (Golden State Warriors)
Adrian Oliver – professional overseas basketball player
Wally Rank – former NBA player (San Diego Clippers)
Sid Williams – former NBA player (Portland Trail Blazers)
C. J. Webster – professional overseas basketball player

Football
Courtney Anderson – former NFL tight end, Atlanta Falcons and Oakland Raiders
Stacey Bailey – former NFL wide receiver, Atlanta Falcons
Kim Bokamper – former NFL linebacker, Miami Dolphins
John Broussard – NFL wide receiver, Jacksonville Jaguars
Gill Byrd – former NFL defensive back, San Diego Chargers; two NFL Pro Bowl appearances
Jim Cadile – former NFL guard, Chicago Bears
Matt Castelo – former NFL linebacker, Seattle Seahawks; former CFL linebacker, Hamilton Tiger-cats
Steve Clarkson – nationally renowned quarterbacks coach; founder of Steve Clarkson Dreammaker quarterback camp
Sherman Cocroft – former NFL defensive back, Kansas City Chiefs
Clarence Cunningham – former AFL wide receiver, defensive back, running back, and kick returner; former AF2 starter, Stockton Lightning; IFL free safety, Catania Elephants
Neal Dahlen – former SJSU quarterback, NFL manager and scout; holds the record for the most earned Super Bowl rings at seven.
Rashied Davis – NFL wide receiver, Chicago Bears
Steve DeBerg – former NFL quarterback, Dallas Cowboys
David Diaz-Infante – former NFL and CFL offensive guard, San Diego Chargers, Denver Broncos, Philadelphia Eagles, and Sacramento Gold Miners
Terry Donahue – UCLA head football coach; College Football Hall of Fame inductee (attended SJSU for one year)
Carl Ekern – former NFL linebacker, Los Angeles Rams; one NFL Pro Bowl appearance
David Fales – Quarterback, Miami Dolphins
Mervyn Fernandez –former NFL wide receiver, Los Angeles Raiders
Coye Francies  – NFL defensive back, Cleveland Browns
Chon Gallegos – NFL quarterback, Oakland Raiders
Jeff Garcia – NFL quarterback, San Francisco 49ers et al.; four NFL Pro Bowl appearances; also played in the CFL and UFL
Jarron Gilbert – NFL defensive tackle, Chicago Bears
Charlie Harraway – former NFL running back, Washington Redskins and Cleveland Browns
Paul Held – former NFL quarterback, Pittsburgh Steelers and Green Bay Packers
Willie Heston – former SJSU halfback;  College Football Hall of Fame inductee (attended SJSU from 1898–1900; graduated from University of Michigan)
James Hodgins – former NFL fullback, St. Louis Rams et al.
Johnny Johnson – former NFL running back, New York Jets; one NFL Pro Bowl appearance; consensus choice for Rookie of the Year (1990)
Cody Jones – NFL defensive tackle, Los Angeles Rams; one NFL Pro Bowl appearance
James Jones – NFL wide receiver, Green Bay Packers
Rick Kane – former NFL running back, Detroit Lions
Bob Ladouceur – among winningest high school football coaches in U.S. history; coached De La Salle High Spartans to 151 consecutive wins from 1992–2003
Bill Leavy – NFL referee; officiated Super Bowl XL
Dwight Lowery – NFL defensive back, New York Jets and two-time All-American at SJSU
Joe Nedney – NFL kicker, San Francisco 49ers
William Yaw Obeng – Arena Football League lineman, San Jose Sabercats
Chris Owens – NFL defensive back, Atlanta Falcons
Tom Petithomme – former AFL player, San Jose Sabercats
Art Powell – NFL wide receiver, Oakland Raiders; Raiders' 7th all-time leading receiver
Waylon Prather – former NFL punter, New Orleans Saints, New York Jets and Arizona Cardinals
David Richmond – former NFL wide receiver, Cincinnati Bengals
Scott Rislov – AFL quarterback, San Jose Sabercats
Al Saunders – former NFL head coach for the San Diego Chargers
Rufus Skillern – CFL and NFL wide receiver, BC Lions and Baltimore Ravens
Gerald Small – former NFL defensive back, Miami Dolphins
Carl Sullivan – former NFL defensive end, Green Bay Packers
Adam Tafralis – CFL quarterback, Hamilton Tiger-Cats
Tyson Thompson –NFL kick returner, Dallas Cowboys
Bob Titchenal – former NFL linebacker, Washington Redskins and Los Angeles Dons; one Pro Bowl appearance; former head football coach, University of New Mexico and SJSU
Dick Vermeil – NFL head coach; winning coach, Super Bowl XXXIV
Bill Walsh – NFL head coach; winning coach, Super Bowl XVI, Super Bowl XIX, and Super Bowl XXIII; Pro Football Hall of Fame inductee
Gerald Willhite – former NFL running back, Denver Broncos
Billy Wilson – former NFL receiver, San Francisco 49ers; six NFL Pro Bowl appearances
Louis Wright – former NFL defensive back, Denver Broncos; 1st round NFL draft pick; five NFL Pro Bowl appearances
Roy Zimmerman – former NFL quarterback, Washington Redskins; one Pro Bowl appearance

Golf
Danielle Ammaccapane – LPGA Tour golfer
Ron Cerrudo – PGA Tour golfer and tour winner
Bob Eastwood – PGA Tour golfer and tour winner
Tracy Hanson – LPGA Tour golfer
Pat Hurst – LPGA Tour golfer and tour winner; #16 on the all-time LPGA money list
Juli Inkster – LPGA Tour golfer; two-time U.S. Women's Open winner (1999 and 2002); #4 on the all-time LPGA money list
Mark Lye – PGA Tour golfer and tour winner
Roger Maltbie – PGA Tour golfer and tour winner
Janice Moodie – LPGA Tour golfer and tour winner
Arron Oberholser – PGA Tour golfer; AT&T Pebble Beach National Pro-Am winner (2006)
Patty Sheehan – LPGA Tour golfer; two-time U.S. Women's Open winner (1992 and 1994)
Ken Venturi – PGA Tour golfer; 1964 U.S. Open winner and Sports Illustrated "Sportsman of the Year"
Mark Wiebe – Champions Tour golfer; PGA Tour winner and senior major winner

Olympic Games

Charles Adkins – 1952 Olympian (boxing); gold medalist
Kevin Asano – 1988 Olympian (judo); silver medalist; USA Judo Hall of Fame inductee
Bob Berland – 1984 Olympian (judo); silver medalist
Felix Böhni — 1980 and 1984 Olympian (pole vault)
Vinnie Bradford – 1984 Olympian (fencing)
Suzannah Brookshire-Gonzales — 2020 Olympian (softball)
Colton Brown — 2016 and 2020 Olympian (judo)
Ed Burke – 1964 and 1968 Olympian (track and field)
Russ Camilleri — 1960 and 1964 Olympian (freestyle and Greco Roman wrestling)
Robin Campbell — 1984 Olympian (track and field – 800 metres)
John Carlos – 1968 Olympian (track and field – 200 meters); bronze medalist; best known for giving raised fist salute from the medalist's podium during the 1968 Summer Olympic Games in Mexico City 
Dedy Cooper – 1980 Olympian (track and field – 110 meter hurdles)
Michelle Cox — 2020 Olympian (softball) 
Jim Doehring – 1992 Olympian (track and field – shot put); silver medalist
Emma Entzminger — 2020 Olympian (softball)
Clara Espar Llaquet — 2020 Olympian (water polo); silver medalist
Lee Evans – 1968 Olympian (track and field – 4x400 meters and 400 meters); two-time gold medalist and world record holder
Jeff Fishback – 1964 Olympian (track and field)
George Haines – swim coach for seven U.S. Olympic teams; head swim coach at UCLA and Stanford University
Steve Hamann – 1980 Olympian (water polo)
Mike Hernandez – 1972 Olympian (soccer)
Mitch Ivey – 1968 and 1972 Olympian (swimming);  silver and bronze medalist
Margaret Jenkins – 1928 Olympian (track and field)
Stacey Johnson – 1980 Olympian (fencing)
Russ Lockwood – 1976 Olympian (Greco Roman wrestling) 
Marti Malloy – 2012 Olympian (judo); bronze medalist
Keith Nakasone – 1980 Olympian (judo)
Ben Nighthorse Campbell – 1964 Olympian (judo)
Ray Norton – 1960 Olympian (track and field)
Christos Papanikolaou – 1968 Olympian (track and field – pole vault); world record holder (first man over 18 feet)
John Powell – 1976 and 1984 Olympian (track and field – discus); two-time bronze medalist
Raju Rai — 2008 Olympian (men's singles badminton)
Ronnie Ray Smith – 1968 Olympian (track and field athlete – 4 × 100 meters); gold medalist and world record holder
Tommie Smith – 1968 Olympian (track and field athlete – 200 meters); gold medalist; best known for giving raised fist salute from the medalist's podium during the 1968 Summer Olympic Games
Willie Steele –1948 Olympian (track and field – long jump); gold medalist
Robyn Stevens — 2020 Olympian (20k race walking)
Jill Sudduth – 1996 Olympian (synchronized swimming): gold medalist
Mike Swain – 1980, 1984, 1988, 1992 Olympian (judo); bronze medalist; first American male to win the World Judo Championships, 1996 US Olympic Judo Coach
Lynn Vidali – 1968 and 1972 Olympian (swimming); silver and bronze medalist
Jim Zylker – 1972 Olympian (soccer)

Other
C.J. Brown – MLS soccer player (Chicago Fire)
Krazy George Henderson – professional cheerleader and inventor of the audience wave
Ryan Lowe – ECHL goaltender (Utah Grizzlies)
Ernie Reyes, Sr. – world-renowned martial artist
Tony Reyes – Professional Bowlers Association member; 17th bowler to throw a perfect 300 game on television; PBA tour winner
 Peter Schifrin (born 1958), Olympic fencer and NCAA champion; sculptor
Ryan Suarez – former MLS soccer player (Los Angeles Galaxy and Dallas Burn)
Yoshihiro Uchida – head coach, SJSU judo team; team coach, 1964 U.S. Olympic judo team; instrumental in developing organized intercollegiate judo competition in the U.S.
Peter Ueberroth – Major League Baseball Commissioner (1984–1989); U.S. Olympic Committee chair; Time (magazine) "Man of the Year"

References

External links